Good News is a song by American pop band Ocean Park Standoff.

Charts

Weekly charts

Year-end charts

References

2016 songs
2016 singles